Gabrielle Fa'amausili (born 17 October 1999) is a New Zealand swimmer. She competed in the women's 50 metre backstroke event at the 2017 World Aquatics Championships. She withdrew from the New Zealand team for the 2018 Commonwealth Games after a knee injury.

Her father is former Samoa national rugby union team player Danny Kaleopa.

References

1999 births
Living people
New Zealand female swimmers
Swimmers at the 2014 Summer Youth Olympics
Female backstroke swimmers
Georgia Bulldogs women's swimmers
New Zealand expatriate sportspeople in the United States
New Zealand sportspeople of Samoan descent
Swimmers from Auckland
People educated at Avondale College